Frank Odhiambo (born 29 October 2002) is a Kenyan professional footballer who plays for IFK Haninge on loan from Djurgårdens IF as a defender.

The connection with Djurgården was established after Kenyan Michael Olunga played for the Swedish club. Djurgården decided to sign Odhiambo after he played in the 2020–21 CAF Champions League, the 2021–22 CAF Confederation Cup and made his debut with the Kenyan national team.

References

External links 
 
 Djurgården profile 

2002 births
Living people
Association football defenders
Kenyan footballers
Kenya international footballers
Gor Mahia F.C. players
Kenyan Premier League players
Djurgårdens IF Fotboll players
Allsvenskan players
Kenyan expatriate footballers
Expatriate footballers in Sweden
Kenyan expatriate sportspeople in Sweden